Andreas Petrus Lundin (21 July 1869 – August 29, 1929), or Andrew Peter Lundin I, was an engineer for the Welin Marine Equipment Company. He created a series of lifeboats. In 1914 to test his design he arranged to have a newlywed couple cross the Atlantic Ocean in a Lundin Power Life Boat. He died on August 29, 1929.

Biography
He was born on 21 July 1869 in Härnösand, Sweden.

See also

Andrew Peter Lundin III

References

1869 births
1929 deaths
Lifeboats
American engineers